Michael Walsh (1934 - 30 September 2013) was an Irish hurler. At club level he played with Slieverue and Mount Sion and was an All-Ireland Championship winner with the Kilkenny senior hurling team before later lining out with the Waterford senior hurling team.

References

1934 births
2013 deaths
Slieverue hurlers
Mount Sion hurlers
Kilkenny inter-county hurlers
Waterford inter-county hurlers
All-Ireland Senior Hurling Championship winners